Pont-de-Larn is a commune in the Tarn department in southern France. It is 2 kilometers from Mazamet in the Occitanie region.

The town is situated on the river Arn (a tributary of the Thoré) in the Haut-Languedoc Regional Nature Park at the foot of the Montagne Noire.

On the sunny side of the Thoré valley, Pont-de-Larn offers residents and guests the ambience of a "country town". There are guest houses and lodges in the vicinity, and marked hiking trails.

There is also a tennis club, stadiums, bowling and one of the oldest golf courses in the region, de la Barouge. The village offers a wide selection of shops, restaurants and services.

Pont-de-Larn can be the starting point for excursions to the Sidobre, the valley of the Orb and the Caroux Lacaune.

References

External links

Virtual travel guide for Pont de l'Arn

Communes of Tarn (department)